The 1909 Open Championship was the 49th Open Championship, held 10–11 June at Royal Cinque Ports Golf Club in Deal, Kent, England. J.H. Taylor won the Championship for the fourth time, six strokes ahead of runners-up Tom Ball and James Braid. Royal Cinque Ports had been added as the sixth course on the Open rota at a meeting in November 1907 at which meeting it was decided it would host in 1909. The meeting also agreed that the Championship was to be played in England and Scotland alternately.

Qualifying took place over 36 holes on Tuesday and Wednesday, 8–9 June. The 204 players were divided into two "sections" and those in the first played on the first morning and second afternoon, while those in the second section played on the first afternoon and second morning. The leading thirty players and ties from each section qualified, with the additional provision that each section had to contain at least thirty professionals. The second section finished their qualifying first with Tom Ball, Harold Hilton and Ted Ray leading on 150. Thirty players scored 159 or better, but this included three amateurs and so the five players on 160 also qualified. Charles Mayo led the first section on 146. Thirty  players scored 160 or better, but this included three amateurs, so the four on 161 qualified. Thus a total of 69 players qualified; 63 professionals and six amateurs.

Charles Johns opened at 72 and led after the first round on Thursday morning, with J. Piper second on 73 and Taylor and Ball a stroke behind. Taylor had the best score in the afternoon and led after the first day on 147, a stroke ahead of Johns, with Ball back on 149 and Sandy Herd on 151; Piper faded badly with an 85 for 157.

On Friday morning, Taylor scored 74, only bettered by a 73 by Braid. Taylor's lead over Ball was extended to four with Braid and Johns a further two behind. In the afternoon, Taylor had another steady round of 74 for 295. After eight holes, Ball was two better than Taylor at the same point but he eventually finished six shots behind Taylor on 301, tied with Braid with Johns a further stroke behind.

Cinque Ports was scheduled to host again in 1915, but World War I intervened; it was the site of the first Open after the war, in 1920.

Course

Past champions in the field 

Source:

Round summaries

First round
Thursday, 10 June 1909 (morning)

Source:

Second round
Thursday, 10 June 1909 (afternoon)

Source:

Third round
Friday, 11 June 1909 (morning)

Source:

Final round
Friday, 11 June 1909 (afternoon)

Source:

References

External links
Royal Cinque Ports 1909 (Official site)

The Open Championship
Golf tournaments in England
Open Championship
Open Championship
Open Championship